The New York State Library School was a school of library science. 

Melvil Dewey established the school at Columbia University. Many of the school's records are currently held at Columbia University. 

In 1889, it was moved to Albany, New York to become the New York State Library School.

References

Columbia University
Information schools
Columbia University Libraries